University Town of Shenzhen is a tertiary education hub or university cluster, located near Xili Lake in the Nanshan District, Shenzhen, Guangdong Province, China. The 15,000-capacity University Town Stadium, which is used mostly for football, is located in the University Town of Shenzhen.

Institutions
There are six higher education institutions with of a total of 50,000 students located in the area:

Nearby locations
 Xili Subdistrict
 Shahe West Road
 Kylin Villa
 Shenzhen Safari Park
 Qilin Mountain

Transportation
University Town Station of the Shenzhen Metro

External links

University Town of Shenzhen

Universities and colleges in Shenzhen
Nanshan District, Shenzhen